The Z800 3DVisor is a head-mounted display manufactured by eMagin since 2005.

Overview
The main part of the Z800 is a pair of OLED displays with magnifying lenses producing a 40-degree diagonal field of view for each eye, used to display stereoscopic images with a fixed resolution of 800x600 pixels, through the use of the nVidia stereo 3D drivers, or, using later firmware revisions, any source of alternating frames. The visor can also be used as a 2D portable monitor on computers not equipped with an nVidia video card, using another operating system, or Macintoshes.

The visor is equipped with a NEC TOKIN combined accelerometer/magnetometer/rate gyroscope 3-degrees of freedom motion sensor used to emulate mouse movements (typically to look around in first-person shooters), a pair of ear buds and an integrated microphone.

See also
 Virtual reality
 3D stereo view

External links
 eMagin Website
 Z800 3DVisor site
 Linux Alpha Drivers
 VR Viewer Headsets

Display technology
Multimodal interaction
Virtual reality headsets
Display devices